The Prince and the Pauper is a 1937 film adaptation of the 1881 novel of the same name by Mark Twain. It starred Errol Flynn, twins Billy and Bobby Mauch in the title roles, and Claude Rains and has been described as "a kids' fantasy."

The film was originally intended to coincide with the planned coronation of Edward VIII in 1936. However, its release was delayed until the following year. The film was released on May 8, 1937, four days before the coronation of King George VI and Queen Elizabeth.

The second theme of the final movement of Erich Wolfgang Korngold's violin concerto was drawn from the music he composed for this film.

Plot
In Tudor England, two boys are born on the same day in the most different circumstances imaginable. Tom Canty (Billy Mauch) is the son of vicious criminal John Canty (Barton MacLane), while Edward Tudor (Bobby Mauch) is the Prince of Wales and the son of King Henry VIII of England (Montagu Love). One grows up in poverty, hungering for something better, taught to read and reason by the wise Father Andrew. The other dwells in isolated luxury, and possesses a strong curiosity about the outside world.

They meet and are astounded by their striking resemblance to each other. As a prank, they exchange clothes, but the Captain of the Guard (Alan Hale, Sr.) mistakes the prince for the pauper and throws him out of the palace grounds. Tom is unable to convince anybody except for the Earl of Hertford (Claude Rains) of his identity. Everyone else is convinced that he is mentally ill. When Henry VIII dies, Hertford threatens to expose Tom—condemning him to a traitor's death—unless he does as he is told. Hertford also blackmails the Captain into searching for the real prince to eliminate that dangerous loose end.

Meanwhile, Edward finds an amused, if disbelieving, protector in Miles Hendon (Errol Flynn). Hendon's opinion of Edward's story changes after Hertford, fearing for his power if the real king lives, instigates an attempt to assassinate the boy. With Hendon's help, Edward manages to re-enter the palace just in time to interrupt the coronation ceremony and prove his identity. Edward becomes King Edward VI while Tom is made a ward of the new king, Hertford is banished for life, and Hendon is rewarded for his services (one of these being the right to sit in the presence of the king).

Cast

 Errol Flynn as Miles Hendon
 Billy Mauch as Tom Canty
 Bobby Mauch as King Edward VI
 Claude Rains as the Earl of Hertford
 Henry Stephenson as the Duke of Norfolk
 Barton MacLane as John Canty
 Alan Hale, Sr. as The Captain of the Guard
 Eric Portman as The First Lord
 Lionel Pape as The Second Lord
 Leonard Willey as The Third Lord
 Murray Kinnell as	Hugo Hendon
 Halliwell Hobbes as The Archbishop
 Phyllis Barry as The Barmaid
 Ivan F. Simpson as Clemens
 Montagu Love as Henry VIII of England
 Fritz Leiber as Father Andrew
 Elspeth Dudgeon as John Canty's Mother
 Mary Field as Mrs. Canty
 Forrester Harvey as The Meaty Man
 Joan Valerie as Lady Jane Seymour
 Lester Matthews as St. John
 Robert Adair as The First Guard
 Harry Cording as The Second Guard
 Robert Warwick as	Lord Warwick
 Rex Evans as Rich Man
 Holmes Herbert as The First Doctor
 Ian MacLaren as The Second Doctor 
 Anne Howard as Lady Jane Grey 
 Gwendolyn Jones as Lady Elizabeth
 Lionel Braham as Ruffler
 Harry Beresford as The Watch
 Lionel Belmore as The Innkeeper
 Ian Wolfe as The Proprietor
 Leo White as Jester (uncredited)

Production
Warner Bros had Billy and Bobby Mauch under contract, and had used them separately in Anthony Adverse, The White Angel and The Charge of the Light Brigade. The studio announced The Prince and the Pauper as part of their line up in June 1936. (They bought the rights to the story from Twain's estate for $75,000.)

Patric Knowles was cast for the role of Miles in October. However Jack L. Warner then decided he wanted someone with a bigger name and asked Errol Flynn to do it.

Reception
According to Warner Bros records, the film earned $1,026,000 domestically and $665,000 foreign making it the studio's most popular film of the year.

Frank S. Nugent of The New York Times wrote, "Bobby and Billy justify their twinship completely, not merely by investing the Twain legend of mistaken royal identity with a pleasing degree of credibility, but by playing their roles with such straightforwardness and naturalness that the picture becomes one of the most likable entertainments of the year ... The novel and the screen have been bridged so gracefully we cannot resist saying the Twain and the movies have met." Variety published a negative review, reporting: "The fragile plot scarcely holds together a full length screen play", and suggesting that its running time could have been trimmed at the beginning so Flynn could enter the film earlier. John Mosher of The New Yorker praised the film as "a fine spectacle". Harrison's Reports called it "An excellent costume picture" with "outstanding" performances.

Other works
The Prince and the Pauper is a novel by Mark Twain with Edward VI of England as the central character. This fictional narrative has been adapted to film many times:
 The Prince and the Pauper (1909), a two-reel short that features some of the only known film footage of Mark Twain, shot by Thomas Edison at Twain's Connecticut home
 The Prince and the Pauper (1915), directed by Hugh Ford and Edwin Stanton Porter; the first feature-length adaptation
 The Prince and the Pauper (1920 film) (German: Prinz und Bettelknabe), a 1920 Austrian film directed by Alexander Korda
 The Prince and the Pauper (1937 film), featuring Errol Flynn as Miles Hendon and Billy and Bobby Mauch as the title characters
 The Prince and the Pauper (1962 film), part of Walt Disney anthology television series television series. It starred Guy Williams as Miles Hendon, and Sean Scully in the dual roles of Prince Edward and Tom Canty.
 The Prince and the Pauper (1977 film), released in the United States as Crossed Swords, starring Oliver Reed, Raquel Welch, Ernest Borgnine, George C. Scott, Rex Harrison, and Charlton Heston
 The Prince and the Pauper (1990 film), an animated short starring Mickey Mouse
 The Prince and the Pauper (2000 film), a television film featuring Aidan Quinn and Alan Bates
 A Modern Twain Story: The Prince and the Pauper a 2007 film starring Dylan and Cole Sprouse

References

External links
 
 
 
 

1937 films
1937 adventure films
American black-and-white films
Cultural depictions of Edward VI of England
Cultural depictions of Lady Jane Grey
Films directed by William Keighley
Films directed by William Dieterle 
Films scored by Erich Wolfgang Korngold
Films set in palaces
Prince and the Pauper 1937
Prince and the Pauper 1937
American swashbuckler films
Films about Henry VIII
Warner Bros. films
American adventure films
1930s English-language films
1930s American films